Marouf Tchakei (born 15 December 1995) is a Togolese footballer who plays as a midfielder for ASKO Kara and the Togo national team.

International career
Tchakei made his debut with the Togo national team in a 0–0 2020 African Nations Championship qualification tie with Benin on 28 July 2019.

References

External links
 
 

1995 births
Living people
People from Kara Region
Togolese footballers
ASKO Kara players
Togo international footballers
Association football midfielders
21st-century Togolese people
Togo A' international footballers
2020 African Nations Championship players